Aleksandr Petrovich Korolyov (born 15 December 1953) is a Russian professional football coach and a past player.

External links
 Career summary by KLISF

1953 births
Living people
Soviet footballers
PFC Krylia Sovetov Samara players
Soviet football managers
Russian football managers
FC Mordovia Saransk managers
Association football forwards
FC Volga Ulyanovsk players